The Jean-Paul Sartre Experience is an EP by New Zealand band Jean-Paul Sartre Experience released in 1986.

Track listing
Quit Side
Fish In The Sea - 03:27
Own Two Feet - 03:17
Walking Wild In Your Firetime - 03:10

Rock Music Side
Flex - 02:55
Loving Grapevine - 02:55

Personnel
Dave Yetton (guitar, vocals, bass, xylophone) 
David Mulcahy (guitar, bass, vocals) 
Gary Sullivan (drums)
Jim Laing (guitar, vocals)

References

Jean-Paul Sartre Experience albums
Flying Nun Records albums